The Removers is a spy novel by Donald Hamilton first published in 1961. It was the third novel featuring Hamilton's creation, counter-agent and assassin Matt Helm.

Plot summary
A year after having been reactivated, Helm receives a message from his ex-wife, asking for his aid, and soon finds himself fighting to protect his family from an enemy agent.

External links
 Synopsis and summary

1961 American novels
Matt Helm novels